Eremophila latrobei, commonly known as crimson turkey bush, native fuchsia, Latrobe's emu bush, grey fuchsia bush, warty fuchsia bush and Georgina poison bush is a flowering plant in the figwort family, Scrophulariaceae and is endemic to Australia. It is an erect, highly branched shrub with usually linear leaves and red to purple-red flowers and which occurs in all mainland states, including the Northern Territory but excluding Victoria.

Description
Its branches are rough due to the presence of persistent leaf bases and are usually glabrous except when immature.

The petal tube is red to purple-red, rarely yellow or cream-coloured. The inside and outside of the tube and petal lobes have scattered glandular hairs. The 4 stamens extend beyond the end of the petal tube.

Taxonomy
The first formal description of the species was published in 1859 by Ferdinand von Mueller in Report on the Plants Collected During Mr. Babbage's Expedition into the North West Interior of South Australia in 1858,  the type specimen being collected from the "Thompson River". The specific epithet latrobei honours Charles La Trobe who was Lieutenant-Governor of Victoria from 1851 to 1854.

Three subspecies are recognised by the Australian Plant Census:
 Eremophila latrobei subsp. filiformis Chinnock which has thread-like, almost cylindrical leaves;
 Eremophila latrobei subsp. glabra (L.S.Sm.) Chinnock which has flat leaves (rather than thread-like leaves) and glabrous sepals;
 Eremophila latrobei F.Muell. subsp. latrobei which has flat leaves (rather than thread-like leaves) and sepals which have branched hairs on the outer surface;

Distribution and habitat
The subspecies latrobei and glabra are widespread, occurring in Western Australia, the Northern Territory, South Australia, Queensland and New South Wales, although in New South Wales, subspecies glabra is only found in the far north-west corner of the state, near Tibooburra. Both subspecies grow in a wide range of habitats and vegetation associations but subsp. latrobei favours mulga and mallee woodland and subsp. glabra prefers sand plain.

Subspecies filiformis is mainly found in the Hamersley Range but isolated populations occur in the Central Ranges, Gibson Desert, Little Sandy Desert, Murchison, Ord Victoria Plain, Pilbara and Tanami biogeographic regions.

Conservation status
All three subspecies of E. latrobei are classified as "not threatened" by the Government of Western Australia Department of Parks and Wildlife.

Use in horticulture
Crimson turkey bush is well known in cultivation. It is a variable species, so that several forms together would add variety to a garden as well as attracting nectar-feeding birds. It can be propagated from cuttings or by grafting onto Myoporum rootstock and only needs occasional watering. Its frost-tolerance depends on which form is grown and therefore it is best grown in a frost-free area. It will grow in more humid areas but requires full sun.

References

latrobei
Flora of New South Wales
Flora of the Northern Territory
Flora of Queensland
Flora of South Australia
Eudicots of Western Australia
Plants described in 1859
Taxa named by Ferdinand von Mueller